Major George Druitt (1773 – 9 June 1842) was a soldier and Australian pioneer. Mount Druitt was named after him.

Druitt became a professional soldier in 1794. As a member of 48th Regiment he sailed to Australia in 1817 on the Matilda, with 440 officers and men. The soldiers were needed to manage the population in Australia, which was mainly convicts. George druitt and mount druitt met on a member.

While on his journey to New South Wales, George met and formed a relationship with Margaret Lynch (his future wife) who had stowed away on the ship to be with one of the other soldiers. Once they arrived in Australia, George and Margaret lived together and had a daughter Judith in 1819, and two sons, George Joseph in 1820 and Edward in 1821. George and Margaret were married in 1825, eight years after they met. After they were married, they had four more children, Joseph in 1825, Margaret Jane in 1828, Jane Euphemia in 1829 and James Cottingham in 1837.

Works in the colony
Druitt oversaw the construction and maintenance of roads and bridges by convict labour around Sydney. He was granted land near what was to become Blacktown. 
The area that was named Mount Druitt in his honour. The suburb which became Strathfield South was also originally named Druitt Town in his honour 

George died on 9 June 1842, aged 69, some four months after his wife.

See also
History of Australia (1788-1850)
European exploration of Australia
History of New South Wales

References

 Sands Sydney Directory DRUITT TOWN Directory entries  1887-1891
 Major George Druitt on BillionGraves
 Magann, H. (1997). They left their mark. Blacktown, NSW. 
 Nicolaidis, G. (1990). The Druitts of Mount Druitt. Blacktown City Council: Blacktown, NSW. 
 Blacktown City Council Library Service - Local History Section - Vertical File: Biography - Druitt, Major George.

External links
Major George Druitt by Blacktown City Council 
Major George Druitt by John Vincent
Colonial Secretary's papers 1822-1877, State Library of Queensland- includes digitised correspondence and letters written by Druitt to the Colonial Secretary of New South Wales

1775 births
1842 deaths
Settlers of Australia
History of New South Wales
19th-century Australian public servants